operating as  and often referred to simply as Dragon Gate (also stylized as Dragongate (ラゴンゲート, Doragongēto)), is a Japanese professional wrestling promotion formerly known as Toryumon Japan. Most of the promotion's wrestlers are graduates of its Dojo or Último Dragón's Toryumon Gym, and thus the promotion is based on a junior heavyweight style with varying emphasis on high flying maneuvers, flashy technical grappling, and submission wrestling.

History
On July 4, 2004, Último Dragón departed from the Toryumon Gym and seized ownership of the "Toryumon" trademarks. The Toryumon Japan promotion subsequently restructured and changed its name to Dragon Gate. Dragon Gate declared Cima (the last one to hold the Último Dragón Gym Championship) to be the inaugural Open the Dream Gate Champion, thus making him the first champion in the promotion's history.

Dragon Gate would make a TV deal to air on Gaora TV, who was also the majority owner of All Japan Pro Wrestling after Motoko Baba sold the rights to the company and gave her power to Keiji Muto. Dragon Gate TV's first episode aired live on July 16, 2004. AJPW TV episodes would also air commercials advertising Dragon Gate's TV debut and would frequently promote future Dragon Gate shows during AJPW commercials, despite there being little interpromotional crossover of AJPW and Dragon Gate in their events. Dragon Gate TV would use an anime intro depicting their wrestlers, the intro's art style being a blend of mainstream anime with Fujiko Fujio-esque animation. Dragon Gate would be the alternative company to the mainstream puroresu companies in the mid 2000s, comparable to ECW's position during the Monday Night Wars.

Since its founding, Dragon Gate wrestlers have also made appearances on the United States independent wrestling circuit, including Ring of Honor which held a Dragon Gate Invasion show on August 27, 2005, in Buffalo, New York, Dragon Gate Challenge on March 30, 2006, in Detroit, Michigan and Supercard of Honor and Better Than Our Best in Chicago, Illinois on March 31 and April 1, 2006, respectively. A six-man match pitting Cima, Naruki Doi and Masato Yoshino against Dragon Kid, Ryo Saito and Genki Horiguchi at Supercard of Honor is one of only a handful of North American matches that wrestling journalist Dave Meltzer has given a five-star rating. Both Ring of Honor's All Star Extravaganza III on March 30 and Supercard of Honor II on March 31, 2007, in Detroit, Michigan featured Dragon Gate in the main events.

October 12, 2007 Baseball Magazine Sha, the publisher of Puroresu Shukan released Dragon Gate trading cards.

In 2008, Dragon Gate promoted their first set of shows in the United States. The first show took place in Los Angeles on September 5 and featured El Generico, Necro Butcher, and Kendo. Their second show was in Hawaii on September 8.

Japan's Dragon Gate promotion announced its expansion into the United States with Dragon Gate USA on April 14, 2009, at the Korakuen Hall event in Tokyo.
 
Also in 2009 it was announced that they created another branch promotion Dragon Gate UK. Their first show was held on November 1, 2009, in Oxford, England.

On March 21, 2018, Dragon Gate announced the creation of Dragon Gate Network, an on-demand service similar to WWE Network and New Japan Pro-Wrestling World. The service officially launched on April 1, 2018. On May 7, 2018, Okamura left his job as President. Toru Kido became the new President and Nobuhiko Oshima (professional wrestler Cima) became the President of Dragon Gate Inc., the international department with the HQ in Shangai, China. In 2019, the promotion celebrated its 20th anniversary. As part of the celebration Ultimo Dragon returned to the promotion in July as a senior advisor. Afterwards, the promotion changed its logo and Dragon Entertainment would be known as Dragon Gate Inc. Within the time of all the changes of the promotion, they started to use the combined Dragongate moniker as its official romaji name.

On February 1, 2020, Dragongate announced a working relationship with American promotion Major League Wrestling (MLW), which would include a talent-exchange between the two promotions.

Dragongate Network
Dragongate Network is a subscription-based video streaming service owned by Japanese professional wrestling promotion Dragongate. Development of the on-demand service was announced on March 21, 2018. Dragon Gate Network was officially launched on April 1, 2018. Dragongate Network operates similarly to WWE Network and New Japan Pro-Wrestling's NJPW World and most notably Ring of Honor's Honor Club, in that pay-per-view events are available to stream through the service, but unlike its aforementioned competitors, some membership tiers must pay extra for these events.

The service currently includes a Dragongate PPV archive and past pay-per-view events and access to all future pay-per-view events and the Dragongate Studio which includes the Prime Zone events with no additional costs for monthly subscription price of ¥1500, as well as access to the Dragongate and Toryumon Japan video tape archive.

Dragon Gate Nex
Dragon Gate Nex was a project of Dragongate, which gave young wrestlers of the promotion more experience.

History
In mid-2006, the NEX project was announced. It would be a series of shows and events that would focus primarily on the recent graduates of the Dragon Gate Dojo, allowing for them to further gain experience in ability while also being seen as the main attraction of a show. Virtually all of the shows take place in the Dragon Gate Arena, the main training ring at the Dragon Gate offices in Kobe, Hyogo, Japan.

In addition to the recent graduates, comedy characters, gaijin talent, and any freelance wrestler currently on tour in Japan would also compete on these shows. The occasional main card member of the roster would compete as well. This was done to further enhance the experience to be gained for the trainees and teach the outsiders how to compete in the Dragon System of wrestling.

The vast majority of NEX shows were called "Sanctuary" and were held twice a month. They generally drew an attendance of around 90 fans due to the limited size and space of the venue. There were also special event shows called "Premium," which were the equivalent in atmosphere to a pay-per-view. These shows involved the main card members of the roster and would draw up to 100 in attendance. Early in NEX, they ran two anniversary shows at Shin-Kiba 1st RING in Tokyo, Japan, although this has since been discontinued.

Dragon Gate Trueborn (Dragon Gate Dojo)

The following is a list of Japanese wrestlers who have graduated from the Dragongate Dojo in Kobe, Hyogo, Japan, along with the USA Dojo in Houston, Texas. Graduates are regarded as Trueborn, having been trained in the Dragon System exclusively through Dragongate as opposed to the Ultimo Dragon Gym. They are listed in alphabetical order.

List of wrestlers graduated

Roster

Championships

Current championships

Defunct Championships 

(I-J Heavyweight Tag Team Championship unified with Open the Twin Gate Championship on October 12, 2007)

Annual tournaments

Affiliates

Broadcasters 
Domestic:
 Gaora (2004–present, broadcasting monthly shows and live specials and taped shows of Dragon Gate Infinity)
 MBS TV (2018–present, currently broadcasting weekly highlights show Cutting Edge Battle Dragon Gate)
 SKY PerfecTV! (2017–present, currently broadcasting live pay-per-view events)
 Nico Nico Douga (2016–present, streaming untelevised spot-shows and interviews)
Worldwide:
 Dragongate Network (streaming service, in partnership with Gaora, broadcasting most Dragongate shows live, as well as on-demand classic)

Former 
 Fighting TV Samurai

See also

Professional wrestling in Japan
List of professional wrestling promotions in Japan

References

External links

Toryumon/Dragon Gate Title Histories
Dragon Gate Network

 
Japanese professional wrestling promotions
2004 establishments in Japan